Emanuel Vahl (born in 1938 in Odessa, Ukraine) is a Ukrainian-Israeli composer. Vahl has composed more than 100 works, including preludes, songs without words, and chamber music. He taught Harmony and Composition at the Conservatory "Hasadna" in Jerusalem, and now he teaches at the Dance Studio of Jerusalem. Vahl has been a member of the Union of Israeli Composers and AQUM since 1991.

Life
Emanuel Vahl studied at the School of Stolyarsky in Odessa, Ukraine and at the Moscow Conservatory. Vahl has organized 15 concerts with his own compositions at the Cultural Center "Hebrew Union College" in Jerusalem, the B'nai B'rith organization, Conservatory "Hasadna" in Jerusalem and the Blumenthal Library in Tel-Aviv, together with the composer Sara Faygin.

In 1990, he made his Aliyah to Israel.

Selected works
Vahl's music is published by the Israeli Music Center.
 Symphony for a Symphonic Orchestra
 Symphonietta for a String Chamber Orchestra
 18 Solo Sonatas – for violin, viola, cello, doublebass, flute, clarinet, trumpet, harp, guitar, marimba, piano, organ, and soprano solo
 Sonata for viola and piano, Op. 89 (2004)
 5 Suites for piano
 Suites for oboe and piano
 Suite for horn and piano
 Suite for 2 cellos, Op. 67 (1999)
 Jewish Suite for strings
 These Suites were performed at the Festival "Sounds of the Desert" in 2004
 Suite for Guitar (printed in Quebec, Canada) in 2003
 Trio for Flute
 String Quartet
 Saxophone Quartet
 Jewish Rhapsody and "Hazanut" for saxophone quartet
 Jewish Ballade for saxophone octet
 Suite for wind quintet
 Adon Olam, Mass for a mixed choir
 Mode Ani Lefaneykha, Mass for a mixed choir
 Hine Ma Tov, Mass for a mixed choir
 Suites for children's choir
 Pieces of Hazanut for voice and piano: "Shema Israel", "Sim Shalom", "Halleluya", "Siman Tov", "Im Ta'hane Alay Ma'hane", "Eley Barekhev", "Isme'hu Bemalkhutekha"
 Mediterranean Dances for piano trio
 many children's songs

References

External links
 Emanuel Vahl at Israeli Music Center 

1938 births
Living people
Ukrainian composers
Israeli composers
Odesa Jews
Soviet emigrants to Israel
Musicians from Odesa